Matthew Sperling is an American Magic: The Gathering player. His major successes include top eights at both Core Set Pro Tours and a win at Grand Prix San Jose 2012 alongside Paul Rietzl and David Williams.

Achievements

References

Living people
American Magic: The Gathering players
People from San Francisco
Year of birth missing (living people)
Place of birth missing (living people)